Jorge Martín Salinas (born 6 May 1992) is a Paraguayan football midfielder who currently plays for Club Sportivo San Lorenzo.

Career
In September 2009, he joined Slovak club AS Trenčín. In March 2010, talented Jorge Salinas graduated 4 days test at Chelsea and in May 2010 graduated camp at Ajax together with teammate Fanendo Adi.

On 20 December 2013, it was announced that Salinas had joined 3 de Febrero for the 2014 Paraguayan Primera División season, and on 4 January 2014 it was reported that the player was one of nine of the club's new signings for the 2014 season

On 17 December 2014, it was reported that Salinas had signed with Club Olimpia Asunción for the 2015 Paraguayan Primera División season.

International career
Salinas participates for Paraguay U17 at the 2009 South American Under-17 Football Championship hosted in Chile. He scores in a group stage fixture against Peru U17, however, Paraguay do not advance to the next round and ultimately do not qualify for the 2009 FIFA U-17 World Cup.

Career statistics

International goals

Paraguay U17
Score and Result list Paraguay's goal tally first.

Honours

Legia Warsaw
1x Polish championship (Ekstraklasa) Winner (2012/13) with Legia Warsaw
1x Polish Cup Winner (2012/13) with Legia Warsaw

References

External links
 
 
  
 
 

1992 births
Living people
Paraguayan footballers
Paraguayan expatriate footballers
People from Paraguarí Department
Association football midfielders
Club Libertad footballers
AS Trenčín players
Legia Warsaw players
Club Atlético 3 de Febrero players
Sportivo Luqueño players
JEF United Chiba players
River Plate (Asunción) footballers
Club Sportivo San Lorenzo footballers
Slovak Super Liga players
Ekstraklasa players
Paraguayan Primera División players
J2 League players
Paraguayan expatriate sportspeople in Japan
Paraguayan expatriate sportspeople in Poland
Paraguayan expatriate sportspeople in Slovakia
Expatriate footballers in Poland
Expatriate footballers in Slovakia
Expatriate footballers in Japan